"De Voetbalmatch" is a song by Louis Davids. It was released on 10" on His Master's Voice in 1929. The B-side to the single is "De Olieman Heeft Een Fordje Opgedaan".

In the song, Louis Davids recounts the experience of a girl visiting a football match in Amsterdam between the likes of AFC Ajax and Blauw-Wit Amsterdam with her boyfriend.

The song was later featured on Louis Davids Greatest Hits album which was releaded on EMI titled "12 Grote successen van de grote kleine man". It was the sixth track of the album, following " Een Hollands meisje" at number 5, with "De olieman heeft een Fordje opgedaan" following at track number 7.

References
Footnotes

External links
 Louis Davids' "De Voetbalmatch" music on YouTube
 Louis Davids' "De Voetbalmatch" lyrics on Songtexte.com

Louis Davids songs
1929 singles
Dutch pop songs
Dutch-language songs
AFC Ajax songs
Blauw-Wit Amsterdam songs
Football songs and chants
1929 songs